Burgenland Croatian is a regional variety of the Chakavian dialect of Croatian spoken in Austria, Hungary, the Czech Republic, and Slovakia. Burgenland Croatian is recognized as a minority language in the Austrian state of Burgenland, where it is spoken by 19,412 people according to official reports (2001). Many of the Burgenland Croatian speakers in Austria also live in Vienna and Graz, due to the process of urbanization, which is mostly driven by the poor economic situation of large parts of Burgenland.

Smaller Croatian minorities in western Hungary, southwestern Slovakia, and southern Czech Republic are often also called Burgenland Croats. They use the Burgenland Croatian written language and are historically and culturally closely connected to the Austrian Croats. The representatives of the Burgenland Croats estimate their total number in all three countries and emigration at around 70,000.

Dialects 
 Štoj dialect: dialect of the Croatian folklore group Štoji (Güttenbach, Stinatz, Neuberg), is Southern Chakavian dialect with some Western Shtokavian features
 Vlah dialect: dialect of the "Vlahi" in Weiden bei Rechnitz, Zuberbach, Althodis, Schandorf, Dürnbach, Allersdorf, etc., is Western Shtokavian (Schakavian) dialect very similar to Western Ikavian with influence from neighboring Burgenland dialects
 Dolinci dialect: dialect of the Dolinci in Unterpullendorf, Frankenau, Kleinmutschen, etc. is a Central Chakavian dialect
 Poljan dialect: dialect of the Poljanci near Lake Neusiedl, is a Central Chakavian dialect
 Hati dialect: Central Chakavian dialect of Hati near Neusiedl
 Grob dialect: Central Chakavian dialect, or mixed Chakavian-Kajkavian dialect, spoken in Chorvátsky Grob etc. in Slovakia

History 

Burgenland Croatian was the language of Croatian refugees who fled Croatia during the Croatian–Ottoman wars and settled in the western part of what was then Hungary, the area where they still live. Burgenland Croats included speakers of all three dialects of the Croatian language (Shtokavian, Chakavian and Kajkavian), with the majority being the Chakavians. A part of them originally probably came from Dalmatia, and all of them mostly emigrated from the river Una valley.

Burgenland Croats did not take part in the shaping of the present standard Croatian in the 19th century. Instead, they constructed their own written standard based mainly on the local Chakavian speech and adopted the Croatian alphabet, a modified Latin alphabet, as their script.

It is still a matter of debate whether Burgenland Croatian should be classified as a Slavic micro-language of its own. Burgenland Croatian dialects are mostly viewed as isolated dialects of the Croatian.

Burgenland Croatian and the Prekmurje dialect of Slovene (in Prekmurje and Hungary) have influenced each other. The first Prekmurje Slovene works (for example, the Old Hymnal of Martjanci) was applied to the Burgenland Croatian books. A few of those that wrote in Prekmurje Slovene were of Burgenland Croatian descent (for example Jakab Szabár) and also Burgenland Croatian (József Ficzkó).

After the dissolution of the Austro-Hungarian monarchy in 1918 the areas in which Burgenland Croats lived were divided between Austria, Czechoslovakia and Hungary. After 1921 most of these areas became part of Austria, which established a new province of Burgenland, after which the Croatian minority was named. In 1922 Austria founded the Apostolic administration of Burgenland and began to abolish bilingual schools through the introduction of the teaching of German in all primary schools. This process was temporarily stopped after The National Education Act, that allowed the work of the Croatian elementary schools, was adopted. After Hitler Annexed Austria in 1938 this law was abolished. In 1955 the Austrian State Treaty was signed. It gave permission to the Burgenland Croats to use Croatian in education, judiciary and public administration. With the adoption of the Law on National Minorities in 1976 use of Croatian in public life became limited. After constitutional complaint was accepted in 1987 parts of the law were changed and Croatian was introduced as an official in 6 out of 7 districts of Burgenland.

Written language 
Burgenland Croatian written language is based mainly on the local Chakavian dialect with some influences from the other Croatian dialects spoken in Burgenland. It uses the Latin alphabet with the same diacritical modifiers as the Croatian alphabet. In the course of language development it acquired some of its own specialised vocabulary, sometimes different from that used in standard Croatian.

The popular The Little Prince has also been translated into Burgenland Croatian (1998), specifically the Standard version by Ivan Rotter.

Differences between Standard and Burgenland Croatian

Example words

First books written in Burgenland Croatian 

The beginnings of literacy are linked to: Klimpuški misal (Klimpuški Missal) (1501), S. Consul Histrianus and Antun Dalmatin's Postila (Fasting) (1568), Dusevne pesne (Duševne pesne, Spiritual songs) (1609) and Grgur Mekinić Pythiraeus's Druge kniige dussevnih peszszan (Druge knjige duševnih pesan, Other books of the Spiritual songs) (1611). Until the mid-19th century, the literature in Burgenland Croatian had religious character and was intended mostly for peasants. Main writers were priests and nuns. In the second half of the 19th century teachers began to write. Thanks to that, many school textbooks and calendars were written.

Newspapers written in Burgenland Croatian 
Newspapers of the Burgenland Croats are: Crikveni glasnik (Church Gazette), 1946; Naše selo (Our village), 1947; Naš tjednik (Our weekly), 1947; Naša domovina (Our homeland), 1952; Glas (Voice), 1957; Novi glas (New Voice), 1969; Put (Way), 1981).

Writers writing in Burgenland Croatian
Most popular Burgenland Croat writers are: J. Mulih (1694–1754), Godefrid Palković (1714–78), L. Bogović (1719–89), E. M. Kragel (1725–88), M. Laáb (cca. 1746–1823), J. Ficko (1772–1843), M. Drobilić (1808–91), T. Jordan (1815–93), G. Glavanić (1833–72), M. Naković (1840–1900), I. Mušković (1848–1930), M. Borenić (1850–1939), Ivan Čuković (1865–1944), P. Jandrišević (1879–1938), I. Blažević (1888–1946), Mate Meršić Miloradić (1850–1928), Ignac Horvat (1895–1973), Martin Meršić, A. Blazović (1921–2004), Franz Probst (1919–93), N. Benčić (b. 1938), Ivan (Lav) Sučić (b. 1938), Mathilda Bölcs (b. 1949), J. Čenar (b. 1956), P. Tyran (b. 1955) and H. Gassner (b. 1955).

The Lord's prayer in Slovene, Burgenland Croatian (1830 and 2021), and Standard Croatian

See also
 Minority languages of Austria
 Dialects of Serbo-Croatian

References

External links 
 Burgenland Croatian Center in Vienna 
 Scientific Institute of the Burgenland Croats 
 Croatian Cultural and Documentation Center in Eisenstadt 

Language
Croatian language
Languages of Austria